The following is a list of episodes from The Circle (sometimes called The Circle US to differentiate from other international versions), an American reality competition series, produced by Studio Lambert and Motion Content Group which first aired on Netflix in January 2020 that is based on a British TV series of the same name.

As of January 18, 2023, 64 episodes of The Circle have aired, concluding its fifth season, which premiered on December 28, 2022.

Series overview

Episodes

Season 1 (2020)

Season 2 (2021)

Season 3 (2021)

Season 4 (2022)

Season 5: Singles (2022-23)

Notes

References

The Circle (franchise)
Circle